England Expects is a British television film produced by BBC Scotland in 2004. It stars Steven Mackintosh and was written by Frank Deasy. Nick Ryan, a journalist and the author of an exposé into far-right groups, worldwide (Homeland: Into a World of Hate), was the show's creative producer.

Synopsis
Former football hooligan Ray Knight (Steven Mackintosh) is a normal everyday family man, living and working as a security guard at a financial trading company in Canary Wharf. He is fiercely protective of his teenage daughter Nikki (Sadie Thompson), who currently lives with her mother and Ray's ex-wife Sadie (Camille Coduri) in a flat at a run-down estate, and he does his best to keep her out of trouble.

After a failed attempt on helping Nikki and Sadie get moved into a new housing development, which is being competed between Whites and Asians, and soon discovering that Nikki is involved in heroin addiction with her Asian neighbour and only friend Rashel (Sadiqul Islam), Ray's anger drives him to join the far-right political ring led by his old friend Larry Knowles (Keith Barron).

Production notes
The film's main objective is to explore the far-right and issues of racism.

References

External links
 Footage from England Expects

BBC television dramas
British television films
2004 in British television